is the second single by Morning Musume subgroup Minimoni. It was released on September 12, 2001 and sold 341,560 copies. The single reached #1 on the Oricon weekly chart, charting for sixteen weeks, making it the group's second consecutive single to reach the top spot on the weekly Oricon chart.

Track listing

Members at time of single

External links 
 Minimoni Telephone! Rin Rin Rin entry on the Hello! Project official website

References

Zetima Records singles
Minimoni songs
2001 singles
2001 songs
Oricon Weekly number-one singles
Songs about telephones
Songs written by Tsunku
Song recordings produced by Tsunku
Japanese-language songs
Songs about buses